Noah Raphael Weißhaupt (born 20 September 2001) is a German professional footballer who plays as a winger for  club SC Freiburg.

Club career
Born in Rostock, Weißhaupt played for SV Kappel and SV Ebnet before joining SC Freiburg's academy in 2012. He was promoted to SC Freiburg II for the 2020–21 season and scored five goals and assisted a further 11 in 33 matches. In summer 2021, he extended his contract with the club and was promoted to the first team. He made his first-team debut on 12 September 2021 as an 87th minute substitute for Lukas Kübler in a 1–1 Bundesliga draw with 1. FC Köln, and was involved in Freiburg's 89th minute equaliser when Köln defender Rafael Czichos turned Weißhaupt's cross into his own goal.

International career
Weißhaupt has represented Germany at under-18 and under-20 international levels.

Personal life
He is the son of former footballer Marco Weißhaupt.

References

2001 births
Living people
German footballers
Sportspeople from Rostock
Footballers from Mecklenburg-Western Pomerania
Association football wingers
Germany youth international footballers
Bundesliga players
3. Liga players
Regionalliga players
SC Freiburg players
SC Freiburg II players
Germany under-21 international footballers